J.N.N Institute of Engineering
It is an Engineering college located in Tiruvallur, Tamil Nadu, India. It is approved by AICTE, New Delhi and affiliated with Anna University, Chennai. The institution was established in 2008 and is promoted by the Alamelu Ammaal Educational Trust.

The Trust also manages J.N.N Arts & Science Women's College, J.N.N Matriculation & Higher Secondary School, J.N.N Vidyallaya, and J.N.N Educational College.

Campus

The campus is housed on a  property.

Athletics
J.N.N.I.E. has teams in Cricket, Football, Volleyball, Badminton and Basketball.

References

External links
 

Engineering colleges in Tamil Nadu
Colleges affiliated to Anna University
Education in Tiruvallur district
Educational institutions established in 2008
2008 establishments in Tamil Nadu